Chang Hwa Bank (CHB) is a Taiwan-based financial institution that offers both retail and commercial banking services to private and corporate customers.

Today, the Bank has seven overseas branches and representatives offices and 175 domestic branches, 4 Sub-branches and 5 securities broker (as of Apr. 2008).

History
It was established in 1905 under Japanese rule in Changhua County, and relocated to Taichung in 1910. Japanese shares were taken over by the Republic of China government after World War II. In December 1997, the Taiwan Provincial Government made public its shareholdings in the Bank in line with the government's policy of financial privatization. The Bank was officially privatized on 1 January 1998.

Corporate structure
Chang Hwa Bank offers nine categories of businesses:
deposits (i.e., such as demand deposit),
corporate/institutional banking (including short- and mid-term operating capital financing, working capital for purchasing raw materials, export loans, capitalize loans and capital expenditure loans),
retail/consumer banking (e.g., mortgage loans, nest building preferential loans, loans for caring mortgage and loans for small suites),
credit cards, offering credit cards and banking cards,
foreign exchange of import and export as well as remittances,
e-banking (e.g., internet banking, telephone banking and mobile banking),
financial trusts, including specific purpose trust funds investing in domestic and foreign securities,
investments, providing government bonds, financial bonds, beneficial certificates and stocks, and security brokerage.

See also
 List of banks in Taiwan
 Economy of Taiwan
 List of companies of Taiwan

References

External links 

Official Website in English: https://ecounter.bankchb.com/frontend/ENAC1.html

1905 establishments in Taiwan
Banks established in 1905
Banks of Taiwan
1946 mergers and acquisitions
2005 mergers and acquisitions
2014 mergers and acquisitions